Dromaeosaurinae is a subfamily of the theropod group Dromaeosauridae. The earliest dromaeosaurine is Utahraptor, dating back to the Early Cretaceous period in North America, however, some isolated teeth seems to represent an indeterminate species of dromaeosaurine, coming from the Late Jurassic period in Africa. If true, this will push their range to the Jurassic period, instead of the Cretaceous, as in most dromaeosaurs.

Most dromaeosaurs are small carnivores, however, dromaeosaurines are represented by some of the largest species (Achillobator, Dakotaraptor, Utahraptor). So far, Dakotaraptor is the only dromaeosaurine with evidence of quill knobs, indicating a plumage; based on this, other members likely had them.

Paleobiogeography
Most dromaeosaurines lived in what is now Asia, North America and possibly Denmark during the Cretaceous period, from the Berriasian to the Maastrichtian stages. However, isolated teeth that may belong to African dromaeosaurines have also been discovered in Ethiopia. These teeth date to the Tithonian stage, of the Late Jurassic period.

Description

Dromaeosaurines were a group of eudromaeosaurs that can be recognised in having stouter, box-shaped skulls, as opposed to the other subfamilies, which generally have narrower snouts, also, dromaeosaurines are generally more heavily built than the other members of their family, with thick, heavy-set legs, which were designed more for strength, rather than for speed. They differ from velociraptorines, in having a low DSDI ratio; i. e., their teeth have equal-sized serrations, on both the posterior and on the anterior edges. By contrast, velociraptorines often have larger serrations on the posterior side of the tooth, than the anterior, or no serrations on the anterior side at all.

According to Turner et al. 2012, technical diagnoses for dromaeosaurines can be established based on the following traits: fully serrated teeth; vertically oriented pubis; pubic boot (or end) projecting anteriorly and posteriorly; the jugal process of the maxilla, in a ventral view to the external antorbital fenestra, is dorsoventrally wide.

Classification
The Dromaeosaurinae was first erected in 1922 by Matthew and Brown as a part of the "Deinodontidae" (now named Tyrannosauridae). It is defined as a monophyletic group including Dromaeosaurus and all the other dromaeosaurs closer to it than to Velociraptor, Microraptor, Passer and Unenlagia.

Cladogram (2012):

The exact consensus for the Dromaeosaurinae phylogeny is still uncertain, since most performed phylogenetic analyses have radically different results with some taxa being recovered on different clades or excluded. According to the phylogenetic analysis performed by Senter et al. 2012, Yurgovuchia represents an advanced dromaeosaurine, closely related to Achillobator, Dromaeosaurus and Utahraptor.

During the description of Dakotaraptor in 2015, it was proposed a new cladistic analysis using data from the Theropod Working Group; below are the results for this analysys:

However, in the most recent analysis conducted by Currie and Evans in 2019, the most representative members of the Dromaeosaurinae were recovered as velociraptorines, such as Achillobator and Utahraptor.

See also

 Timeline of dromaeosaurid research
 Dromaeosauridae
 Eudromaeosauria

References

External links
 Dromaeosaurinae in the Paleobiology Database

Eudromaeosaurs
Fossil taxa described in 1922